is a Japanese surname. It is also a Maharashtrian surname from India with a similar pronunciation. It can refer to:

Japanese people
Date clan, a lineage of daimyōs who controlled northern Japan in the late 16th century and into the Edo period
, Japanese samurai
, Japanese daimyō
, Japanese leader
, Japanese samurai
, Japanese samurai
, Japanese samurai
, Japanese samurai
A branch of the Date Clan where the heads of the Uwajima Domain, in the former Iyo Province of Japan (present-day Ehime Prefecture) on the south-eastern island of Shikoku
, Japanese daimyō; first-born son (by concubine) of Masamune Date
, Japanese leader
, Japanese voice actress
, Japanese/American architect and designer
, Japanese professional tennis player
, Japanese actor and singer
, Japanese baseball player
, Japanese comedian
Miwako Date (born 7 May, 1971), Japanese businesswoman

Fictional Japanese characters
Eiji Date in the manga/anime series Fighting Spirit (Hajime no Ippo)
Sage Date in the anime series Ronin Warriors
Kyosuke Date in SoulTaker
Kenta Date in Denji Sentai Megaranger
Akiko Date in the Young Samurai book series
Naoto Date in the manga and anime series Tiger Mask
 in Kamen Rider OOO
Ryuusei Date in Super Robot Wars
Wataru Date in Case Closed
, a virtual idol
Kaname Date in the video game AI: The Somnium Files

Other people
Christopher J. Date, author and researcher in relational database technology
Terry Date, an American record producer
Arun Date, a Marathi singer

See also
Date (disambiguation), other uses of the word "date"

Japanese-language surnames